State Highway 2 is a state highway in the Indian state of Andhra Pradesh. It starts at Macherla in the west and ends at Guntur in the east end of the Guntur district.

Route 

The major destinations in route are Macherla, Gurazala, Dachepalle, Piduguralla Sattenapalle and the terminal destination of Guntur. Prior to the bifurcation of the state of Andhra Pradesh, the state highway passed through Narketpally-Addanki-Medarametla.

See also 
 List of State Highways in Andhra Pradesh

References 

Transport in Guntur
State Highways in Andhra Pradesh
Roads in Guntur district